Theresa Kufuor (née Mensah; born 25 October 1935) is the wife of John Kufuor, the second President of the Fourth Republic of Ghana, and former First Lady of Ghana. She is a retired nurse and midwife.

Education
Kufuor started her education at the Catholic Convent, OLA, at Keta in the Volta Region of Ghana. She later went to London, where she was educated as a Registered General Nurse, in the Southern Hospital Group of Nursing. Edinburgh, Scotland.

After further study at the Radcliffe Infirmary, Oxford and Paddington General Hospital, London, she qualified as a State Certified Midwife with a Certificate in Premature Nursing.

Personal life
Theresa married John Kufuor when he was at age 23 after they met at a Republic Day Anniversary Dance in London in 1961. They got married in 1962. She has five children with John Kufuor, former president of Ghana; J. Addo Kufuor, Nana Ama Gyamfi, Saah Kufuor, Agyekum Kufuor and Owusu Afriyie Kufuor. She is a mother of five, and a grandmother of eight. She is a devout Roman Catholic.

Despite being the first lady of Ghana for eight years between 2001 and 2009, she has managed to maintain a low profile in the political arena. In 2007 she pushed for policy changes in the Government's white paper on Educational Reforms towards the implementation of UNESCO's Free compulsory universal basic education (FCUBE) program for kindergarten children.

She founded the Mother and Child Community Development Foundation (MCCDF), a non-governmental organisation operating in Ghana and Canada that supports work in prevention of mother to child transmission.

Honours
On October 25 Pope Benedict XVI conferred on her husband President John Kufuor, the Papal Award of Knight Commander of St. Gregory the Great, for his dedicated service to mankind and the Catholic Church in general.
Theresa Kufuor, on her part was awarded the Papal Award Dame of St Gregory the Great for her commitment to the plight of poor children and their mothers.

See also
Nana Konadu Agyeman Rawlings
First Lady of Ghana

References

Living people
1937 births
First ladies of Ghana
Ghanaian Roman Catholics
People from Brong-Ahafo Region
New Patriotic Party politicians